Loccota is a rural locality in the local government area (LGA) of Flinders in the North-east LGA region of Tasmania. The 2016 census recorded a population of 20 for the state suburb of Loccota.

History 
Loccota was gazetted as a locality in 1977. Originally known as Nughata, the name was changed in 1924. Loccota is believed to be an Aboriginal word for “sea-shore”.

Geography
The waters of Bass Strait form the western to southern boundaries.

Road infrastructure 
Route C806 (Trousers Point Road) provides access to the locality.

References

Towns in Tasmania
Flinders Island